The 1994 Shreveport Pirates season was the first season in the teams franchise history. They finished last place in the East division with a 3–15 record and failed to make the playoffs.

Offseason
During the 1993 season, Bernie Glieberman was the owner of the Ottawa Rough Riders franchise. The city refused to renegotiate the terms of the lease for Frank Clair Stadium and Glieberman threatened to move the franchise. Instead, Glieberman sold the franchise to local businessman Bruce Firestone. Glieberman was offered the opportunity to start a new franchise and the Shreveport Pirates were born. His son Lonie was named team president and the Gliebermans were leased Independence Stadium at a 10-year lease for $2,500 a game.  Lonie Glieberman boasted that the Pirates would be the first US based CFL franchise to win the Grey Cup.

Training camp
The Pirates first training camp was meant to be on the grounds at Louisiana State University. Instead, there was a scheduling error and the Pirates were forced to hold their training camp on the grounds of the Louisiana State Fair. The players were housed in a large barracks style room that housed 12 to 18 players, and were on the second level, while animals were on the first level.  Pirates player Joe Mero would book a nearby hotel room at his own expense.    
Head coach John Huard was the former football coach at the Maine Maritime Academy and he would be fired during training camp. An incident occurred where Huard berated a volunteer athletic therapist. The therapist left training camp and Huard was released from his coaching duties.    Huard was replaced by NFL Hall of Famer and former Cincinnati Bengals and Toronto Argonauts head coach Forrest Gregg. Gregg convinced the Gliebermans to remove the Vice President of Operations and the General Manager.

Preseason

Regular season
Despite the losing, Shreveport averaged a respectable attendance of 17,871 fans per game. The Pirates set a CFL record with the longest losing streak in history (14 consecutive losses).

Schedule

Awards and honors
Ben Williams, Defensive Tackle, CFL Eastern All-Star
Joe Fuller, Defensive Back, CFL Eastern All-Star

References

External links
 Shreveport Pirates team profile

Shreveport Pirates
Canadian Football League seasons
Shrev